Babemba Traoré was a king of the Kénédougou Empire.  Following the 1893 death of his brother Tieba Traoré, Babemba assumed the Kénédougou throne.  The capital, Sikasso, was beset at this time by both the Mandinka forces of Samory Touré and by the rapidly advancing French colonial army.  The neighboring Toucouleur Empire's capital at Ségou had fallen to the French the previous year, leaving the French free to focus on subduing the Kénédougou.

In April 1898, the French began a major artillery barrage against Sikasso's walls; the city itself fell on May 1, 1898.  Rather than surrender to the French, Babemba ordered his guards to kill him, an action still celebrated in Mali today.  Samory Touré was captured in September of the same year, marking the effective end of West African resistance to French rule.

History
Mansa Douala, Traoré was the father of Tieba Traore, Babemba (Bangaly Traore), and Sillatequi Traore and others. Tieba Traore was the youngest brother of Babemba Traore and Sillatequi(spelling) Traore, and after the war, and calm returned to Kenedougou the two elder brothers set out on a new journey in two different directions, for farming, the now Guinea direction and the now Burkina Faso direction, leaving Tieba Traore the youngest home with his mother, the youngest of the wives. Tieba Traore was left in charge of the family home with his mother, but realizing that his mother was not happy in Duru (spelling), he took off to his mother's home, Sikasso, Mali where he was warmly welcomed by his uncles and maternal family. Because of the status of the family, he was received as the head of the Traore, and the town Sikasso became the new headquarter of the Traore. He became a fearless warrior defending his people. He built a strong force in Sikasso and later the Tata (the wall) when it was heard that Samori Toure and his men were passing through Sikasso. Samori and his men arrived in Sikasso en route for an all out assault, he requested that the people of Sikasso give him 43 men and 43 women to take his war material and food to the battle ground, which Tieba Traore and his men refused, because they were ready to fight Samori Toure. Samori Toure and men could not enter the Tata (the wall) because it was fortified and any attempt by Toure and men could have resulted in a blood bath. Toure decided to take a chance by waiting at the Mamelon with his men where they survived on fruit's seeds. The seeds became trees and are a part of Sikasso's history. Samori Toure could not penetrate the town of Sikasso because of the wall. The people had already made sacrifice, making sure that they maintained control of the city of Sikasso. In the end, no war took place between Samouri Toure and Tieba Traore.

When the French were about to extend their rule onto Sikasso, they called a meeting with Tieba Traore in Segou. After the meeting, the commander of the French forces decided to escort Tieba Traore back to Sikasso. Tieba Traore decided that leaving the commander to return was not in his best interest at that time. The force in Sikasso killed the French commander which led to the first all out confrontation between Tieba Traore and the French. The French forces were defeated during the first attack, and some were killed; their graves can be found in Sikasso. The French decided to regroup to attack Sikasso for the second time, and it was during the second attack that Tieba Traore didn't survive, but there are no details on his death.

His brother Babemba was on the side now called Guinea when he learned about the war and his brother's death. He secretly left his family without any detail as to where he was going. During Babemba's stay in Sikasso, the French decided to make the final push to take complete control over the town of Sikasso, and it was during this time that Bambemba and the force of Tieba had to defend the town. But with heavy cannons, the French were able to blast the Tata (the wall) to enter the town of Sikasso and it became a blood bath. Babemba(Bangaly Traore) told his men that he would not going to be captured and treated the way Samori Toure was. He told one of his men to shoot him when he realized that there was no way out. Even though he was there to sympathize with his brother's family, he was also dissatisfied with the manner in which his sister was used as the sacrifice of the town of Sikasso. He could not hold his brother responsible for the fact that she was sacrificed in his absence, and that she volunteered to be the sacrificial lamb for the town to keep the town safe from Samori Toure and any attack. After Samori's departure from Sikasso, it was not too long that the French captured Samori Toure and he was sent to Gabon to serve time, and died there.

Stadium
The stadium of Sikasso, Stade Babemba Traoré, today bears his name.

See also
Samori Ture

1898 deaths
Malian royalty
19th-century monarchs in Africa
Year of birth missing
Kénédougou Kingdom